The Horelica Tunnel is a road tunnel in northern Slovakia. It is located on the D3 motorway at the Oščadnica - Čadca section (Čadca bypass). The total length of the tunnel without portals is 555 m, and with portals 605 m.

Its construction began in July 2000 and the breakthrough was reached in May 2002. The tunnel with Čadca bypass was opened on October 29, 2004, and it replaced road 11, which runs across the town of Čadca.

External links
 Horelica Tunnel (English)
 Tunel Horelica (Slovak)

Road tunnels in Slovakia
Tunnels completed in 2004
Articles containing video clips